Pseudo-scholarship (from pseudo- and scholarship) is a term used to describe work (e.g., publication, lecture) or a body of work that is presented as, but is not, the product of rigorous and objective study or research; the act of producing such work; or the pretended learning upon which it is based.

Examples of pseudo-scholarship include:

Pseudoarchaeology
Pseudohistory
Pseudolinguistics
Pseudomathematics
Pseudophilosophy
Pseudoscience

See also

Chaos magic
Conspiracy theory
Counterknowledge
Crank (person)
Fallacy
Fringe science
Fringe theory
Ignoratio elenchi
Junk science
Predatory journal
Proto-science

References

External links

Pseudo-scholarship
Barriers to critical thinking